Statistics of Swedish football Division 2 for the 1992 season.

Vårserier (Springseries)

Norra Norrland

Södra Norrland

Östra Svealand

Mellersta Svealand

Östra Götaland

Mellersta Götaland

Västra Götaland

Södra Götaland

Höstserier (Autumnseries)

Kvalettan Norra

Kvalettan Södra

Hösttvåan Norrland

Östra Svealand

Västra Svealand

Östra Götaland

Västra Götaland

Södra Götaland

Footnotes

References
Sweden - List of final tables (Clas Glenning)

1992
3
Sweden
Sweden